The Free State Provincial Legislature is the primary legislative body of the South African province of Free State. It is unicameral in its composition, and elects the premier and the executive council from among the members of the leading party or coalition in the parliament.

Powers
The Free State Provincial Legislature chooses the Premier of Free State, the head of the Free State's provincial executive.  The legislature can force the Premier to resign by passing a motion of no confidence. Although the Executive Council is chosen by the Premier, the legislature may pass a motion of no confidence to force the Premier to change the composition of the Council. The legislature also appoints Free State's delegates to the National Council of Provinces, allocating delegates to parties in proportion to the number of seats each party holds in the legislature.

The legislature has the power to pass legislation in numerous fields specified in the national constitution; in some fields, the legislative power is shared with the national parliament, while in other fields it is solely reserved to the Free State alone. The fields include health, education (except universities), agriculture, housing, environmental protection, and development planning.

The legislature oversees the administration of the Free State provincial government, and the Premier and the members of the Executive Council are required to report to the legislature on the performance of their responsibilities. The legislature also manages the finances of the provincial government by way of the appropriation bills which determine the Free State's provincial budget.

Election

The provincial legislature consists of 30 members, who are elected through a system of party list proportional representation with closed lists. The most recent election was held on 8 May 2019. The following table summarises the results.

The following table shows the composition of the provincial parliament after past elections.

Officers

The following people have served as Speaker of the Free State Provincial Legislature:

Members

References

Provincial legislatures of South Africa
Unicameral legislatures